Aquisalimonas asiatica  is a Gram-negative, moderately halophilic, strictly aerobic and motile bacterium from the genus of Aquisalimonas which has been isolated from water from the Lake Chagannor from the Inner Mongolia.

References 

Chromatiales
Bacteria described in 2007
Halophiles